Jindong Township is a township under the administration of Qianjiang District, Chongqing, China. , it administers Yangjia Residential Neighborhood and the following five villages:
Jindong Village
Yuquan Village
Daya Village
Zaohua Village
Fengtai Village

References 

Township-level divisions of Chongqing